Goodbye Rania (stylized as Goodbye RANIA) is the debut studio album by South Korean multinational girl group Blackswan, released through DR Music on October 16, 2020. The album contains three new track including the double lead single "Tonight" and "Over & Over" and also previous single release by Rania from 2011 to 2017. It marks their first release after re-debut as Blackswan with previous Rania member Hyeme, Leia, Youngheun and two new member Judy, and Fatou. It was the last release with member Hyeme prior her left the group on November 9, 2020.

Background information
On June 26, 2020, it was announced by DR Music that they would be debuting their girl group Rania as Black Swan, consisting of 3 Rania members, plus new members Judy and Fatou. The group originally had their debut scheduled in the early half of 2020, but it was postponed due to the COVID-19 pandemic that occurred earlier in the year. On September 25, it was announced that the group had already filmed their debut MV and would be debuting in October 2020. On October 9, the group began posting teaser images to social media, revealing the album title and release date of October 16. On October 14, the band released a teaser for lead single, "Tonight," said to be written and produced by Melanie Fontana.

Promotion
Black Swan promoted their debut at the Pyeongchang Peace Festival on August 7, 2020, where they performed songs "Demonstrate," and "Tonight." On October 20, the group released a dance performance MV.

The group began to promote their title track "Tonight" on October 30 performing on KBS World's Music Bank, followed by performances on SBS MTV's The Show on November 3, and another Music Bank performance on November 6.

Track list
Credits adapted from Genius.

References

DR Music albums
2020 albums
Korean-language albums